The education of Welsh history has gained further emphasis during the 20th and 21st centuries and today is a mandatory part of the Welsh curriculum.

History teaching in Wales was taught from a British-centric or Southern English perspective until the later part of the 20th century. The policy of Welsh History education was not compulsory in Wales until the 1990s. Today it is a compulsory element of the part of the Curriculum for Wales (2022-present) as determined by the Welsh Government. The teaching of Welsh history and ethnic minority history was introduced as part of this new curriculum from September 2022.

Teaching of Welsh history

20th century

"For Wales, see England" 
According to professor Robert Philips, if it is accepted that history is an important element of national identity, then Wales did not exist in the eyes of pupils in the 20th century. Literature evidence confirms that the conflation of "English" and "British" history dominated and that the English curriculum applied just as much to Wales.

Jeremy Slater says that history education in Wales was "mostly a jumble of Acts of Parliament, of kings and battles in English history, leavened in the latter decades by forays in social and local history." History of the English curriculum was "largely British, or rather Southern English; Celts looked in to starve, emigrate or rebel; the North to invent looms or work in mills; abroad was of interest once it was part of the Empire; foreigners were either, sensibly allies, or, rightly, defeated. Skills - did we even use the word?- were mainly those of recalling accepted facts about famous dead Englishmen, and communicated in a very eccentric literary form, the examination length essay. It was an inherited consensus, based largely on hidden assumptions."

In the 20th century, there were multiple reports concluding that Welsh history was taught inadequately and a recommendation from 1931 that at least one question was asked on Welsh history, which had not been taken on by the WJEC (exam board) after the second world war. this continued until 1967, when the Gittins report called for Welsh students to be taught more Welsh history. This was then blamed on the lack of curriculum direction following the Education Act 1944 and lack of Welsh devolved institutions. The only inclusion of Welsh history was a ration of Welsh history and occasional local or Welsh mention, with no nationalised policy. Proposed reasons include English control in Wales, lack of Welsh devolved institutions and suspicions in the South Wales industrialised areas of Welsh nationalism.

Improvement 
In the 60s and 70s the quality and quantity of resources with an emphasis on Wales improved including works sponsored by the University of Wales Press and the Board of Celtic Studies. This also led to an improvement in school resources. In the late 70s and 80s, Her Majesty's Inspectorate of Education and the Welsh Office sponsored heritage and culture initiatives which also improved school resources. In the early 1980s, education of Welsh history was still inconsistent and inadequate. The GCSE was introduced in 1986 and led to some development of Wales specific resources but Welsh history teaching was still not mandatory. The Education Reform Act 1988 then legislated for a national curriculum in England and Wales.

Welsh History Committee 
In 1982, the Association of History Teachers of Wales (AHTW) formed which led to the establishment of a committee on history curriculum in Wales. In 1989, the AHTW appointed the National Curriculum History Committee for Wales (HCW) under the chairmanship of Rees Davies. They advised the Secretary of State for Wales on "the content of Welsh history which should be incorporated into the history curriculum in Wales’ through a report which set out and justified a balanced and complete curriculum for history in Wales".

In 1990, the HCW produced a final report that said, "The history of Wales is the history of a distinct people and nation. That is how it has been and is perceived by Welsh men and women. It is true that since the thirteenth century Wales has not had a separate machinery of government, or the other organs of statehood. She has, however, retained her own language and culture and a strong awareness of a separate identity."

An English equivalent was also produced and the production of two reports showed that there existed a unique cultural, temporal and national Welsh existence, which was of interest to historians. The two reports, one by the Welsh committee and one by the English committee, led to the 1991 history statutory orders. Since 1995, the Curriculum Cymreig became a statutory common requirement in every National Curriculum subject in Wales meaning that, "In Wales, pupils should be given opportunities, where appropriate, in their studies to develop and apply knowledge and understanding of cultural, economic, historical and linguistic characteristics of Wales (Welsh Office, 1995). By the 1990s a distinct curriculum in Wales had become established. Welsh history had become compulsory within British, European and World contexts between the ages of 5 and 14.

Devolved era

Criticism of lack of Welsh history 
In 2015, Welsh historian Elin Jones said that Welsh pupils were "deprived" of not being taught history from a Welsh perspective, and that there should be a far bigger emphasis on Welsh history, with there being "very little evidence" of this. She added that nothing had improved since her 2013 report for the Welsh government. Dr Jones added,  "I did a soft consultation by going to public libraries and talking to the public when I was preparing my report and very many people said to me that their education had robbed them of the opportunity to learn about their own country. And that's a sad thing to learn."

In 2015, 10-15% of History GCSE was about Wales and WJEC CEO Gareth Pierce added that there is a lack of Welsh history teaching but that the WJEC was moving towards GCSE history where of the three units taught, two of these will include a fundamental Welsh perspective.

In 2020, on the national curriculum in Wales UCAC, were concerned about "ability and willingness" to teach Welsh history as not all history teachers are Welsh. Swansea University historian Martin Johnes added that "There is no guarantee that any pupil will learn about medieval conquest, the flooding of Tryweryn, the Second World War, the struggles for civil rights, or the rise of democracy." he added that there is a danger of discrepancy based on which school pupils attend.

A 2021 Estyn report found that Welsh students had "little knowledge" of Welsh history.

In 2022, Plaid Cymru Member of Senedd, Heledd Fychan criticised the lack of Welsh history teaching in Wales, adding that Welsh children know more about England under the Tudors than about the history of Wales. She also criticised Labour politician Neil Kinnock who said that Wales had practically no history between the 16th and 18th centuries.

In the same year, Dr Stephen Thompson of Aberystwyth University has said tat children in Wales in both Welsh and english medium schools are growing up "without any real sense of the history of their own communities and are far more conversant with the history of other countries”.

Teacher, Iwan Jones said "Welsh history has been neglected over the past 30 or 40 years." Jones says that the main area to improve is to provide modern resources for teachers to better teach Welsh history.

Gaynor Legall, of the history group The Heritage & Cultural Exchange had previously said to a Senedd Committee, “I want the kids who live in the docks…to know about north Wales…as much as I want the people in Harlech…to know about the docks and about the coal industry…because it’s about Wales.”

History Grounded 
Elin Jones' book History Grounded was provided to all schools in Wales by the Welsh Government in early 2022 in time for the 2022/2023 academic year. Sian Gwenllian, the designated member from Plaid Cymru for the cooperation agreement, noted that Jones' book adds a "positive development" and will help to support teachers in teaching Welsh history. Gwenllian added that a proper understanding of Welsh history is an "integral part of ensuring that young people in Wales understand their nation’s past, present and future."

Lack of teaching skills 
According to some, there is a lack of investment and a skills gap when it comes to teaching Welsh history in both primary and secondary schools. Education adviser Huw Griffiths has said that making Welsh history compulsory is a "game changer" but that there is insufficient resources for teachers in Wales. He says that teachers have had far more exposure to the history of the USA and the Nazi's than Welsh history and don't have the expertise to teach Welsh history, adding that this is "a vicious circle that we need to break".

Elin Jones has said about the state of Welsh history teaching that she is concerned that the state of delivery of Welsh history could be in the "same position as we were 20 years ago". Jones said that she wants to see "more than legislating" and that teachers need to shown how to deliver the history which includes ethnic minority history and incorporating Welsh history teaching with a wider context. She said that there is no guidance for teachers to deliver this.

Teaching of ethnic minority history 
A 2021 Estyn report showed that Welsh students have little knowledge of diverse history. Wales was set to become the first country in the UK to make ethnic minority history a mandatory part of the school curriculum, set to be implemented in September 2022.

Jones said that she wants to see "more than legislating" and that teachers need to shown how to deliver the history which includes ethnic minority history and incorporating Welsh history teaching with a wider context. She said that there is no guidance for teachers to deliver this.

The Welsh education minister, Kirsty Williams said in March 2021, that under new changes to the school, from September 2022, BAME (Black, Asian and minority ethnic) history would be taught in schools.

21st century curricula

2008 Curriculum 

The Curriculum 2008 is used in schools in Wales until it is fully replaced by the Curriculum for Wales which was implemented from 2022. Pupils aged 7–14 are taught according to the Curriculum Cymreig including a teaching of the cultural, economic, environmental, historical and linguistic characteristics of Wales. Pupils aged 14–19 are taught via the Wales, Europe and the World which includes the political, social, economic and cultural aspects of Wales and as part of the world.

2022 Curriculum 

In 2012, the Welsh government set up a task group headed by historian Elin Jones to review of history, Welsh history and the Curriculum Cymreig and minister Leighton Andrews saying that there had been significant increase in interest in the history of Wales over the preceding decade. This followed ACCAC’s guidance on ‘Developing the Curriculum Cymreig’ in 2003. In 2013 “The Cwricwlwm Cymreig, history and the story of Wales report” was published. In 2015 Professor Graham Donaldson built on this report in devloping a Cwricwlwm Cymreig that should have six Areas of Learning and Experience (AoLE) and tht each AoLE should have a Welsh dimension and an international perspective. All schools were set to have access to the new Curriculum for Wales from 2020 with the goal of implementation in September 2022, per the cooperation agreement in the Senedd between the Welsh Labour Government and Plaid Cymru.

References 

Curricula
Education in Wales
Secondary education in Wales